The Finding of Moses is a c.1582-1598 oil on canvas painting attributed to Paolo Veronese or produced by his studio, now in the Galleria Sabauda in Turin.

References

1580s paintings
1590s paintings
Paintings in the Galleria Sabauda
Veronese, Turin